Virgil Hugo "Buck" Batterman (April 1, 1918 – January 5, 1999) was an American professional basketball player. He played for the Oshkosh All-Stars in the National Basketball League and averaged 1.2 points per game.

References

1918 births
1999 deaths
American men's basketball players
Basketball players from Wisconsin
Forwards (basketball)
Oshkosh All-Stars players
Sportspeople from Oshkosh, Wisconsin
Wisconsin–Oshkosh Titans men's basketball players